The Raymond Gordon Ernest Guishard Technical Centre is an association football facility in Pope Hill, The Valley, Anguilla.

It has a capacity of 1,100.

In 2015, it hosted Group 1 in the 2015 Caribbean Football Union Boys’ U-15 Championship and in 2016, the venue hosted the senior Anguilla national football team match against Puerto Rico in the 2017 Caribbean Cup qualification campaign.

References

Sports venues in Anguilla
Football venues in Anguilla
Buildings and structures in The Valley, Anguilla